Aviación del Noroeste S.A de C.V was a Mexican airline based in Hermosillo, Mexico. It was shut down in 1995 and is currently defunct.

History
The airline was established in 1988 with two Fokker F27 Friendship turboprop aircraft, beginning with flights to the island destination of Cedros, Mexico. In 1989, routes to Mazatlan, Mexico were added. The airline also received a Boeing 727-200 from Mexicana de Aviacion to operate flights to Toluca, Mexico and Mexico City, but the aircraft was never operated in scheduled passenger service. In 1990, TAESA, a Mexican air carrier, acquired the airline and supplied it with more F27 propjets. In 1992, the airline was bought out by Grupo Hermanos Abed ("Abed Brothers Group", abbreviated as GHA) a general aviation investment company. Abed Brothers Group is also the owner of the group Hoteles Aristos, a hotel chain based in Mexico City and directed by Alberto Abed and his brother, Asclepiodoto Abed. Alberto was hired to run both Aeroliteral, another Mexican air carrier, and TAESA, which allowed the airline to obtain three ATR 42 regional turboprops. In the same year the airline was planning to begin a new service to Mexico City operated with a Boeing 737-500 leased from TAESA. In February 1994, the Abed brothers encountered legal disputes and, after many court proceedings, Asclepiodoto retired the 737 and one ATR 42 to Noroeste. Shortly thereafter, Asclepiodoto left GHA and retired to Buenos Aires, while Alberto continued directing the company. Then, on February 10, 1994, Alberto died in a car accident in Toluca. Under the ownership of TAESA, Noroeste managed to continue to operate for another year after his death. Finally in 1995, TAESA halted the airline's operation, and it has not operated since.

Destinations in 1989

According to the airline's route map, the following destinations in Mexico and the U.S. were being served in 1989 with all flights being operated with Fokker F27 Friendship turboprop aircraft:

 Chihuahua
 Ciudad Juarez
 Ciudad Obregon
 Guaymas
 Hermosillo
 Mazatlan
 Mexicali
 Phoenix
 Tijuana
 Tucson

Historical fleet
ATR 42 (1992–1995)
Boeing 737-500 (1992–1994)
Fokker F27 (1988–1992)

References

Defunct airlines of Mexico
Airlines established in 1988
Airlines disestablished in 1995